Zetatorquevirus is a genus in the family of Anelloviridae, in group II in the Baltimore classification. It encompasses the single species Torque teno douroucouli virus.

References

External links 
ICTV Virus Taxonomy 2009 
UniProt Taxonomy 
 
 ICTVdb
 ViralZone: Zetatorquevirus

Anelloviridae
Virus genera